Trade printing is a business model wherein a printer offers printing materials to print brokers, graphic designers, ad agencies, and other printing businesses at a wholesale rate. When a trade printer ships an order, the reseller passes it on to the end user or ships the order directly to the end user on behalf of the reseller. Generally, the trade printer's name or other identifying information does not appear anywhere on or within the packaging.

References

Business models
Printing